Walter Farley (born Walter Lorimer Farley, 26 June 1915  – 16 October 1989) was an American author, primarily of horse stories for children. His first and most famous work was The Black Stallion (1941), the success of which led to many sequels over decades; the series has been continued since his death by his son Steven.

Life
Farley was the son of Walter Patrick Farley and Isabelle "Belle" L. (Vermilyea) Farley. His uncle was a professional horseman and taught him various methods of horse training and about the advantages or disadvantages of each method. Farley began to write The Black Stallion while he was a student at Brooklyn's Erasmus Hall High School and Mercersburg Academy in Pennsylvania. He finished it and had it published in 1941 while still an undergraduate at Columbia College of Columbia University, where he received a B.A. the same year.

Most of the novel takes place in New York City, albeit one of its less developed areas: Flushing, in the borough of Queens. The neighborhood is near the site of the 1939 World's Fair and the Belmont Park racetrack, an important venue for horse racing. This area up to the end of World War II still supported agriculture, including cows, horses and truck farming. After the War, the land was sold and eventually high rise apartments were built.

Farley and his wife, Rosemary, had four children—Pam, Alice, Steven and Tim—whom they raised on a farm in Pennsylvania and in a beach house in Florida. In 1989 Farley was honored by his hometown library in Venice, Florida, which established the Walter Farley Literary Landmark in its children's wing.   Farley died of cancer in October 1989, shortly before the publication of The Young Black Stallion, the twenty-first book in the series, and during production of the television series The Adventures of the Black Stallion.

Bibliography

List of books in the Black Stallion series 
The Black Stallion (1941)
The Black Stallion Returns (1945)
Son of the Black Stallion (1947)
The Island Stallion (1948)
The Black Stallion and Satan (1949)
The Black Stallion's Blood Bay Colt (1950)
The Island Stallion's Fury (1951)
The Black Stallion's Filly (1952)
The Black Stallion Revolts (1953)
The Black Stallion's Sulky Colt (1954)
The Island Stallion Races (1955)
The Black Stallion's Courage (1956)
The Black Stallion Mystery (1957)
The Horse-Tamer (1958)
The Black Stallion and Flame (1960)
The Black Stallion Challenged (1964)
The Black Stallion's Ghost (1969)
The Black Stallion and the Girl (1971)
The Black Stallion Legend (1983)
The Young Black Stallion (1989)

Others
Man o' War
Big Black Horse (young children's easy-reader version of The Black Stallion)
Little Black, A Pony
Little Black Goes to the Circus (1963) Beginner Books Book Club Edition 
The Little Black Pony Races
The Horse That Swam Away
Great Dane Thor
Walter Farley's How to Stay Out of Trouble with Your Horse: Some Basic Safety Rules to Help You Enjoy Riding (1981) (nonfiction)

References

External links
 Finding aid to Walter Farley papers at Columbia University. Rare Book & Manuscript Library.

1915 births
1989 deaths
Writers from Syracuse, New York
People from Berks County, Pennsylvania
Columbia College (New York) alumni
American children's writers